Peepli Live is a 2010 Indian satirical black comedy film that explores the topic of farmer suicides and the subsequent media and political response. It is written and directed by Anusha Rizvi in her directorial debut, and produced by Aamir Khan Productions. The film stars Naya Theatre company member Omkar Das Manikpuri as well as Naseeruddin Shah, Raghubir Yadav, Nawazuddin Siddiqui, Shalini Vatsa and Malaika Shenoy along with a number of newcomers. Peepli Live, distributed by UTV Motion Pictures, was released on 13 August 2010.

Peepli Live was India's official entry for the 83rd Academy Awards Best Foreign Film category although it was not nominated.

Plot

Natha is a poor farmer from the village of Peepli in Mukhya Pradesh, who struggles to farm enough money for his family made up of his elder brother, Budhia, his wife, Dhaniya, his three young children and his ailing mother Amma, who spends most of her time lying down and screaming at Natha and Dhaniya. Natha and Budhia often pretend to go out farming when actually they save up whatever money they have to buy alcohol. This has left the whole family famished and now the banks are demanding repayment of loans or else the family will be stripped of their land and house. In the meantime, the Mukhya Pradesh Government have called a by-election due to continuous criticism of their blind eye towards the desperate poverty that surrounds India's largest state. The opposition Apna Dal Party believe they have a chance to form the government in this election as the people have lost faith in the long-serving Sammaan Party and its Chief Minister, Ram Babu Yadav who, along with Federal Agriculture Minister, Saleem Kidwai, believes in the industrialisation of rural areas.

To save his land and to save his family from becoming homeless, Natha, encouraged by his brother, decides to commit suicide after he requests help from the rural headmen and they suggest that his committing suicide is a good way to get loan money waived, and after which his family will receive heavy compensation for his death. While Natha and his brother are discussing this possibility at a local tea stall, the news gets reported by Rakesh, a local reporter from Peepli. This report then gets picked up and highlighted by the national English news channels and reaches the Chief Minister. The media starts surrounding Peepli sensing the possibility of a sensational suicide story. One ITVN journalist particularly keen on filming the event of Natha's death is Daytime Presenter, Nandita Malik. She joins the local reporter Rakesh Kapoor and takes desperate measures to interview Natha and his family on the subject of Natha's suicide. However things get more tricky when rival Hindi news channel, "Bharat Live" finds out about Natha and Peepli. The news channel clashes with ITVN and each try to film Natha's impending death in their own manner. The Sammaan Party also soon discover Natha's plans and try to buy off Natha with sops to prevent him from committing suicide. Opposition parties like the Apna Dal and the CPI also get involved and plan to use Natha as a path to power in the elections. Peepli soon becomes the centre of attention across Mukhya Pradesh.

Nandita's frantic attempts to interview Natha get worse when Rakesh does not find Natha or anyone else in Peepli to interview. She seems unimpressed with Rakesh's compassionate stand towards Natha and believes that as reporters their duty lies in reporting and following the news and nothing else. On the other hand, "Bharat Live" continues to be successful in their attempts to interview. Yet as time goes on, Natha does not die. Meanwhile, the Sammaan Party realise that if Natha commits suicide, they will lose the elections. The rural headmen secretly kidnap Natha and hold him ransom for money from the opposition. Yet their plans are foiled when Rakesh discovers Deepak and his men holding Natha hostage at a Peepli barn. A rush occurs when people from Apna Dal, the CPI, ITVN, Bharat Live and Peepli villagers all rush to find Natha. In the confusion, a spillage accident from a Petromax lamp sets fire to the barn, which explodes and Rakesh is killed. The Government officials mistake Rakesh for Natha and refuse to pay Natha's family the compensation money due to the death being an accident. Meanwhile, Natha is in fact alive and flees to Gurgaon and is seen working as a day labourer in the construction industry.

His family loses their land to the bank.

Cast
 Omkar Das Manikpuri as Natha
 Raghubir Yadav as Budhia
 Malaika Shenoy as Nandita Malik
 Nawazuddin Siddiqui as Rakesh
 Naseeruddin Shah as Saleem Kidwai, the Agriculture Minister
 Aamir Bashir as Vivek Vashisht
 Anoop Trevedi as Thanedar Jugan
 Ishita Vyas as Reporter
 Shalini Vatsa as Dhaniya
 Indira Tiwari as Reporter 
 Avijit Dutt as Boss of English TV Channel	
 Farrukh Jaffar as Amma
 Vishal O Sharma as Kumar Deepak
 Sitaram Panchal as Bhai Thakur
 Sandeep Yadav as cameraman of Nandita Malik

Production
Peepli Live began as a script written by NDTV journalist Anusha Rizvi called The Fallen. In 2004 Rizvi asked Aamir Khan to read her script and, although he initially refused as he was preoccupied with shooting Mangal Pandey: The Rising, he eventually decided to finance the film after she described the plot to him. In an interview, Khan explains the meaning of the movie title: "When we were looking for the right title before we began the publicity and promotions of the film, we came up with Peepli Live. Peepli is the village that film is set in, the "live" part is meant to indicate: here is a story that is happening in Peepli that the filmmaker is bringing to you live. That's why it's Peepli Live." Peepli Live was filmed on various locations in Madhya Pradesh such as Bhopal, Indore, Tikamgarh, Khurai as well as in New Delhi. Maxima Basu designed the costumes aptly capturing the rural essence of the film. According to Aamir Khan, many of the actors are Adivasis from the sub-urban area of Bhopal, Bhadwai in Madhya Pradesh. Other cast members are from playwright Habib Tanvir's theatre troupe Naya Theatre.

Release
Peepli Live competed in the Sundance Film Festival, the first film from India to achieve this feat. With support of media billionaire Keyur Patel of Fuse Global who is major hollywood financier "Peepli Live" was selected at Sundance Film Festival and his relationship with Robert Redford provided a great platform there. It received an 'A' adult certificate in India for language use. The movie was picked up by speciality German distribution company Rapid Eye Movies for a special screening at the Berlin International Film Festival. It was also named the Best First Feature Film at the 31st Durban International Film Festival in South Africa. In the United Kingdom, the film was released on 24 September. Peepli Live reportedly recovered its cost before its release itself.

Reception

Critical reception
Peepli Live received positive reviews. Subhash K. Jha, film critic and author of The Essential Guide to Bollywood, describes Peepli Live as "a work of damning ramifications." He further states that, "To most of us out here sitting in the auditorium, farmers' suicide is just a headline. Read, regretted and then put to bed. Peeply (Live) is that savagely raw and hurtful wake-up call for the conscience which does not mince words." Nikhat Kazmi of the Times of India gave the film three and a half out of five stars stating," How smart can Indian cinema get? Exhilarating answer: Very smart. And that's the bottomline of Peepli Live, a small little film, that showcases the real India without glossing over the contradictions of our fumbling-bumbling democracy or getting overtly sentimental about garibi and the attendant grime that goes with it. Pratim D. Gupta of The Telegraph wrote "Peepli Live demands to be absorbed and not just watched over the weekend" and praised the director Anusha Rizvi – "she has the gift of the dark humour satire ala Shyam Benegal and in her uncompromised shooting style, she shows the fire of Mira Nair". Taran Adarsh of Bollywood Hungama gave it four and a half out of five stars and argues that "the concept [farmers' suicides] would instinctively translate into a serious, thought-provoking film. But Peepli [Live] takes a grim and solemn issue, turns it into a satire, garnishes it with populist sentiment and makes a far greater impact than a mere documentary, had it tackled the burning issue. In fact, like all Aamir Khan films, Peepli [Live] marries realism with a winning box-office formula most brilliantly." Mayank Shekhar of The Hindustan Times gave the film four out of five stars arguing that "the satire is irresistible; the subtext, compelling. And yet neither shows itself up in any form of self-seriousness. The comic writing is immaculately inspired". Noyon Jyoti Parasara of Yahoo gave the film 3.5 out of five and said, "Peepli [Live] is a class act and director Anusha Rizvi and producer Aamir Khan could take a bow for working this into reality". Rajeev Masand of CNN-IBN also gave it three and a half out of five stars, calling it "a scathing satire on the country's apathy towards the rural class, and specifically towards farmers, Peepli Live employs a comic tone to tell a serious story. The witty script turns Natha into something of a local celebrity, who draws out the true character and motivations of all those who cross his path." Mathures Paul of The Statesman gave the film 4 out of 5 stars noting that, "Anusha Rizvi demolishes successfully whatever little faith we had in the political process. Peepli (Live) is entertaining and inspiring".

, the film holds an 86% approval rating on Rotten Tomatoes, based on 28 reviews with an average rating of 6.32 out of 10. On Metacritic, the film had an average score of 69 out of 100, based on 12 reviews, indicating "Generally Favorable" reviews.

Box office
The film collected  by the end of its third week and was declared a super hit. Overseas, the film opened to a limited release at 64 places in the U.S, and was ranked third, grossing $350,054 in the domestic market and $700,000 worldwide in its opening weekend.

Awards and nominations

2011 Filmfare Awards
 Nominated: Filmfare award for Best Film
 Nominated: Filmfare award for Best Costume Design

2011 Star Screen Awards
 Winner : Star Screen Award for Best Ensemble Cast 

6th Apsara Film & Television Producers Guild Awards
 Winner : Apsara Award for Best Story – Anusha Rizvi 
 Nominated : Apsara Award for Best Performance in a Comic Role – Omkar Das Manikpuri
 Nominated : Apsara Award for Best Actor in a Supporting Role (Male) – Raghubir Yadav
 Nominated : Apsara Award for Best Actor in a Supporting Role (Female) – Farukh Jaffer

2011 Zee Cine Awards
 Nominated : Best Film
 Nominated :Best Comedian – Omkar Das Manikpuri

5th Asian Film Awards
 Winner : Best Composer - Indian Ocean 
 Nominated : Best Film - Aamir Khan
 Nominated : Best Newcomer - Omkar Das Manikpuri
 Nominated : Best Editor - Hemanti Sarkar

 3rd Mirchi Music Awards
 Winner : Upcoming Lyricist of The Year - Bhadwai Village Mandali - "Mehngai Dayain"
 Nominated : Upcoming Lyricist of The Year - Noon Meem Rashid - "Chola Maati Ke Ram"
 Nominated : Male Vocalist of The Year - Bhadwai Village Mandali - "Mehngai Dayain"
 Nominated : Music Composer of The Year - Bhadwai Village Mandali - "Mehngai Dayain"
 Nominated : Music Composer of The Year - Nageen Tanvir - "Chola Maati Ke Ram"

Soundtrack

The music is composed by Indian Ocean, an Indian band and Ram Sampath.

Track listing

Controversies
The film was subject to a few controversies. VJAS (Vidarbha Janandolan Samiti), the Nagpur-based farmer's advocacy group, asked the Maharashtra government to ban the film due to its depiction of farmer suicides. Kishor Tiwari, the president of VJAS, stated: "TV serial 'Bairi Piya' has shown that debt-trapped Vidarbha farmers are selling daughters to clear their debt, while 'Peepli Live' is far from reality and an insult to poor farmers of Vidarbha who have been victims of globalization and wrong policies of the state."

In addition, according to the Hindustan Times, "folk singer Rama Joshi alleges that a song Chola Mati Ke Ram, which has been used in the film, does not give credit to Gangaram Siwar, a celebrated folk singer of Chhattisgarh and the original lyricist of the folk song." In response, Nageen Tanwir, who sang the song in the film, stated: "The song, Chola Maati Ke Ram, has been composed by Gangaram Siwar in Chhattisgarh, but the Habib Tanvir theatre group has officially purchased rights for the song. So I don't understand why people from Chhattisgarh are asking for their due again."

Also, according to John Travolta, Peepli Live was inspired by 1997 English film Mad City. In an interview with The Hindu, he stated that he was astonished to learn that India's official entry for the Oscars this year, Peepli Live, was inspired by Mad City, his best film as an actor.

The film's storyline also shares similarity to Malayalam film Pakal. Its director M. A. Nishad says: "The storyline of the Bollywood movie Peepli Live has a similar theme to Pakal, which was released much before the Hindi film. The difference was in the narrative style."

The song "Mehngai dayan khaye jat hai" was challenged in court by the Congress party alleging that Sonia Gandhi was called as "Dayan" (female ghost) in the movie. However, the argument did not sustain and the case was dismissed by the court holding that Sonia Gandhi was not responsible for the rising inflation in India.

See also
 List of submissions to the 83rd Academy Awards for Best Foreign Language Film
 List of Indian submissions for the Academy Award for Best Foreign Language Film

References

External links
Official
 
 Peepli Live – Aamir Khan Productions 

Database
 
 
 
 

Films shot in India
Films about farmers' suicides in India
Films about the mass media in India
Indian satirical films
2010 films
UTV Motion Pictures films
2010 directorial debut films